Chakvi Mandeer is an album by Jass Bajwa. The album was composed by Gupz Sehra whereas lyrics for the album were penned by Jass Bajwa & Lally Mundi. The album was released on record label Panj-aab Records. The album also marks as debut for Jass Bajwa.

The album was released on 16 September 2014 on record label Panj-aab Records. Jass Bajwa was also nominated for Best Debut Award at PTC Music Awards.

Track listing

References

2014 albums